Waldo A. Evans (1869 – April 15, 1936) was a captain of the United States Navy and military Governor of both the United States Virgin Islands and American Samoa. He was the last military governor of the U. S. Virgin Islands.

Life and naval career
Evans was born in Indianapolis, Indiana. In 1919, he was given command of the battleship .

From 1920 to 1922, Evans was made the military governor of American Samoa during a period of native unrest and immediately after the suicide of Governor Warren Jay Terhune. His investigation focused on two sailors, one of whom was later court martialed, and one civilian, who was deported back to the United States.

In 1922, he was made commander of the Great Lakes Naval Training Station, near Chicago. In 1925, he retired from the Navy.

After the unexpected death of Governor Trench, Evans was asked out of retirement to govern the United States Virgin Islands. As Governor, Evans signed a bill which granted all citizens of the islands United States citizenship, effective February 28, 1927. In September 1928, the islands were hit by a hurricane, resulting in six deaths and $400,000 worth of property damage (approximately $4.3 million in inflation-adjusted 2005 dollars). He also faced opposition from the sugar plantations in the territories by his insistence that they modernize, due to the potential cut on a sugar tax. In 1931, President Herbert Hoover placed the island under civilian rule, also ending Evans' term as Governor on March 18, 1931.

In 1935, Evans' wife died in an automobile accident in California. Following her death, he fell into ill health and eventually had a stroke. He died in Des Moines, Iowa, in 1936.

References
"Samoan Trouble Focused" The Los Angeles Times. Nov 30, 1920. pg. I2, 1 pgs
"Naval Court Files Report on Samoa" Los Angeles Times. Feb 28, 1921. pg. I2, 1 pgs
"Evans made Governor of Virgin Islands" New York Times. Jan 19, 1927. pg. 17, 1 pgs
"Virgin Islanders' Joy at Citizenship" Aldolph Gereau. New York Times. Mar 20, 1927. pg. XX16, 1 pgs
"Plea for Virgin Islands" New York Times. Sep 17, 1928. pg. 3, 1 pgs
"Hoover's Order Ends Naval Rule in Virgin Isles" Chicago Daily Tribune. Mar 3, 1931. pg. 15, 1 pgs
"Long Illness Proves Fatal To Capt. Evans" The Washington Post. Apr 16, 1936. pg. 5, 1 pgs

External links

1869 births
1936 deaths
Governors of American Samoa
Governors of the United States Virgin Islands
United States Navy personnel of World War I
People from Indianapolis
United States Navy officers
Military personnel from Indiana